Gotești is a commune in Cantemir District, Moldova. It is composed of two villages, Constantinești and Gotești.

Notable people
 Gheorghe Stavrii 
 Ion Creangă (jurist)
 Oxana Iuteș

References

Communes of Cantemir District
Populated places on the Prut